The list of shipwrecks in July 1923 includes ships sunk, foundered, grounded, or otherwise lost during July 1923.

1 July

2 July

3 July

4 July

5 July

6 July

7 July

9 July

10 July

12 July

13 July

14 July

15 July

18 July

19 July

20 July

22 July

24 July

26 July

28 July

29 July

31 July

References

1923-07
Maritime incidents in July 1923
07
July 1923 events